Larunda (also Larunde, Laranda, Lara) was a naiad nymph, daughter of the river Almo in Ovid's Fasti.

Mythology 
The only known mythography attached to Lara is little, late and poetic, coming to us from Ovid's Fasti. She was famous for both beauty and loquacity (a trait her parents attempted to curb). She was incapable of keeping secrets, and so revealed to Jupiter's wife Juno his affair with Juturna (Larunda's fellow nymph, and the wife of Janus). For betraying his trust, Jupiter cut out Lara's tongue and ordered Mercury, the psychopomp, to conduct her to Avernus, the gateway to the Underworld and realm of Pluto. Mercury, however, fell in love with Lara and prepared to force her as she pleaded with a glance, unable to speak. Lara thereby became mother to two children, referred to as the Lares, invisible household gods. However, she had to stay in a hidden cottage in the woods so that Jupiter would not find her.

Larunda is likely identical with Muta "the mute one" and Tacita "the silent one", nymphs or minor goddesses.

Etymology 
Because she said to Juno the affair of Jupiter with Juturna, her name was connected with λαλεῖν, which means talk, speak in Greek.

Cult 
Ovid mentions the myth of Lara and Mercury in connection with the festival of Feralia on February 21. Lara/Larunda is also sometimes associated with Acca Larentia, whose feast day was the Larentalia on December 23.

References

External links 
Myth Index - Larunda

Naiads
Children of Potamoi
Women of Hermes
Mythological rape victims
Characters in Roman mythology